Developed by Mitsubitshi Electric Research Laboratories, a privacy-enhanced computer display allows information that must remain private to be viewed on computer displays located in public areas (i.e. banks, hospitals and pharmacies) by employing the use of both ferroelectric shutter glasses and a unique device driver.

History 

Prior to the invention of privacy-enhanced computer display by the Mitsubitshi Electric Research Laboratories, several static systems that serve a similar purpose were established.  

Static system is a preventive tool that protects the public computer display without any dynamic alterations to the video stream itself. For instance, a security screen that prevents any users who are not on the right angle to see the display is a static system. Another example of the static system is the front polarizer of the LCD screen. Such polarizer is removed when the computer display is in "secure use". The authorized users who have access to the confidential information need to wear a polarized sunglasses to see the screen.

Technology 
Privacy-enhanced computer display technology utilizes a public display image ( denoted Pij for the pixel value at location i,j in the public image), a secret display image (Sij, similarly denoted for pixel value at pixel location i,j ), a proprietary device driver, a CRT capable of rapid refresh rates (up to 120 Hz) and a set of synchronized ferroelectric shutter glasses.  The device driver causes the computer monitor to alternately display the pixelwise difference (Pij – Sij) and the unaltered secret image (Sij).

When viewed directly without the shutter glasses, the human eye's persistence of vision blurs the two images into [(Pij  – Sij  + Sij) / 2], which reduces to (Pij / 2), which is the public image, effectively preventing an unintended recipient from viewing the secret image.

The intended recipient, wearing the synchronized glasses, will see only the (Sij) secret image.

Advantages and disadvantages
The major advantage of the shutter glass system was that it allowed the same display to be used for multiple unrelated images, one of which was visible without any glasses at all.  Unfortunately, the contrast ratio of the public image is only 1/2 the available contrast ratio of the CRT when driven with only a public image.

A secondary issue was that although the image was privacy-enhanced, it was not secure.  The secret image appeared as a "ghost" if one moved one's head rapidly - or struck the viewer's head with a soft object, thereby offsetting the two image fields and revealing the edges of the difference image.

With the rapid growth of handheld phones with integrated digital cameras (and fast shutters) the phone's camera video will often reveal alternating frames of the public and secret images.  This effectively breaks the privacy capability of the system.

A final issue is the decline of the CRT and the rise of the LCD in display technology, because nearly all LCDs are too slow to support the 120 Hz or faster refresh rate needed for this privacy enhancement to work.  Meanwhile, lenticular monitor filters have diminished the need for the shutterglass technology.

Possible applications 
 Banks (bank balance information)
 Hospitals (patient health information)
 Pharmacies (prescription drug information)
 Airline ticketing and airport gate agent stations (passenger and security information)

Sales 

The patent was sold in 2010 to Intellectual Ventures, who obtained a reissue in 2012 (US patent RE43,362) with additional claims.

References

External links
US Patent 7,164,779
Uperfect Portable Monitor

Display devices
Mitsubishi Electric products, services and standards